The Georgia Aviation Hall of Fame recognizes aviation pioneers and contributors associated with the state of Georgia. The museum was created in 1989 by Governor Joe Frank Harris signing House Bill 110. The law called for a 15-member board to oversee the hall of fame, and for it to be housed at the Museum of Aviation at Robins Air Force Base.

Candidates may be living or deceased, but must have been born in Georgia, lived in Georgia for at least four years, or made their contribution to aviation or aerospace in Georgia. The first class of seven was inducted at a banquet on August 26, 1989. A second group of seven was inducted at Robins on May 18, 1991 and a third class of five was inducted on November 7, 1992. Additional inductions have continued into 2022, with the hall of fame now containing 123 individuals.

Inductees

See also

 North American aviation halls of fame

References

External links 
 Official Web Site

State halls of fame in the United States
Aviation halls of fame
Aviation history of the United States
Lists of people from Georgia (U.S. state)
Halls of fame in Georgia (U.S. state)
Aerospace museums in Georgia (U.S. state)